The Chinese Ambassador to Tunisia is the official representative of the People's Republic of China to the Republic of Tunisia.

List of representatives

References 

Ambassadors of China to Tunisia
Tunisia
China